Ali Naderi is a paralympic athlete from Iran competing mainly in seated discus and javelin events in the F55 classification.

Naderi competed in the 2004 Summer Paralympics where as well as competing in the discus he won the F55-56 combined javelin.

He holds the world record hold in javelin for F55 classified athletes.

References

External links
 

Paralympic athletes of Iran
Athletes (track and field) at the 2004 Summer Paralympics
Paralympic gold medalists for Iran
Living people
World record holders in Paralympic athletics
Year of birth missing (living people)
Place of birth missing (living people)
Medalists at the 2004 Summer Paralympics
Paralympic medalists in athletics (track and field)
Iranian male discus throwers
Iranian male javelin throwers
21st-century Iranian people